Slovakia competed at the 1994 Winter Olympics in Lillehammer, Norway.
It was the first Winter Games since the dissolution of Czechoslovakia, and so the Czech Republic and Slovakia competed as independent teams.

Alpine skiing

Women

Women's combined

Biathlon

Men

Men's 4 × 7.5 km relay

Women

 1 A penalty loop of 150 metres had to be skied per missed target.
 2 One minute added per missed target.

Cross-country skiing

Men

 1 Starting delay based on 10 km results. 
 C = Classical style, F = Freestyle

Women

 2 Starting delay based on 5 km results. 
 C = Classical style, F = Freestyle

Women's 4 × 5 km relay

Ice hockey

Group B
Twelve participating teams were placed in the two groups. After playing a round-robin, the top four teams in each group advanced to the Medal Round while the last two teams competed in the consolation round for the 9th to 12th places.

Final Round
Quarter final

|}

Consolation round

|}

5th place match

|}

Leading scorers

Team roster:
Eduard Hartmann
Jaromír Dragan
Miroslav Michalek
Jerguš Bača
Marián Smerčiak
Miroslav Marcinko
Ľubomír Sekeráš
Vladimír Búřil
Stanislav Medřik
Ján Varholík
Róbert Švehla
Vlastimil Plavucha
Oto Haščák
Dušan Pohorelec
René Pucher
Miroslav Šatan
Branislav Jánoš
Roman Kontšek
Peter Šťastný
Ľubomír Kolník
Jozef Daňo
Róbert Petrovický
Žigmund Pálffy
Head coach: Július Šupler

Luge

Men

Women

Nordic combined 

Men's individual

Events:
 normal hill ski jumping
 15 km cross-country skiing

Ski jumping

References
Official Olympic Reports
 Olympic Winter Games 1994, full results by sports-reference.com

Nations at the 1994 Winter Olympics
1994
1994 in Slovak sport